Vongooru is a Mandal in Nagarkurnool district in Telangana.

Institutions
 Zilla Parishad High School
 Indian Overseas Bank
 Government Junior college

Villages
The villages in Vangoor mandal include:
 Annaram 	
 Charakonda 	
 Chowdrapalle 	
 Dindichinthalapalle 	
 Gajara 	
 Jajala 	
 Konapur 	
 Kondareddipalle
 Konetipur 	
 Mittasaguda 	
 Nizamabad 	
 Polkampalle 	
 Pothireddipalle 	
 Rangapur (Yellamma Rangapur)
 Sarvareddipalle 	
 Sirsangandla
 Thimmaipalle 	
 Thippareddipalle 	
 Thumula Palle 	
 Thurkalapally 
 Ulpara 	
 Ummapur 	
 Uppal Pahad 	
 Vongooru
 Venkatapur

References

Mandals in Nagarkurnool district
Nagarkurnool district